The Return of the King (also known as The Return of the King: A Story of the Hobbits) is a 1980 animated musical fantasy television film created by Rankin/Bass and Topcraft. It is an adaptation of the 1955 high fantasy novel Lord of the Rings, taking its name from The Return of the King, the third and final volume of The Lord of the Rings by J. R. R. Tolkien and is a sequel to the 1977 film The Hobbit.

The special aired on ABC on Sunday, May 11, 1980 after a legal challenge filed by the Tolkien Estate and Fantasy Films was settled. Critical and fan reaction to The Return of the King was lukewarm.

Plot

At Bilbo Baggins's 129th birthday party in Rivendell, his nephew Frodo explains why he is missing a finger from his hand while the Minstrel of Gondor sings a ballad that tells the story of the quest to destroy the One Ring and defeat the Dark Lord Sauron.

In Mordor, Frodo's friend and companion Samwise Gamgee bears the Ring in Frodo's absence as he ventures to rescue Frodo from the Orc fortress of Cirith Ungol. During his journey, Sam is tempted to claim the Ring for himself, but ultimately resists its power. He rescues Frodo, and the two Hobbits head out for Mount Doom to destroy the Ring.

Meanwhile, the wizard Gandalf the White and the Hobbit Pippin arrive at Minas Tirith to warn Denethor, the Steward of Gondor, about the upcoming war—only to discover that the Steward has gone insane and means to take his own life. Frodo and Samwise continue toward Mount Doom (eluding Ringwraiths and infiltrating a battalion of Orcs in the process) only to be attacked by Gollum, the creature from whom Bilbo took the Ring decades before. Frodo casts Gollum down, however, and goes to the Crack of Doom. Sam prepares to kill Gollum, but is overcome with pity and allows him to flee.

At the same time, Gondor's neighbouring country, Rohan, battles Sauron's forces in the Battle of Pelennor Fields, but its King, Theoden, is killed by the Witch-king of Angmar. Theoden's niece Eowyn, who had disguised herself as a man to take part in the battle, kills the Witch-king with help from Merry, momentarily defeating Sauron's armies. Those forces momentarily rally upon the arrival of the black fleet coming from the west, the despairing vision of which drove Denethor to his suicide, but their morale shatters upon realizing that fleet is under the command of Prince Aragorn of Gondor. Upon his own arrival, Aragorn, heir to the throne of Gondor, plans to confront Sauron at the Black Gate. Here, he quarrels with the Mouth of Sauron and the two armies prepare for battle.

On Mount Doom, Frodo succumbs to the Ring's power and puts it on, becoming invisible. Sam discovers Gollum and Frodo fighting over the Ring, which results in Gollum's biting off Frodo's finger to claim it. While dancing with joy at the retrieval of his "precious", Gollum falls into the lava of Mount Doom, taking the Ring with him. The Ring is destroyed, and Sauron perishes. Sam and Frodo are rescued by the Eagles from the erupting Mount Doom. A few months later, Aragorn is crowned King of Gondor. 

The story concludes with Frodo accompanying Bilbo, Gandalf, and Elrond as they leave Middle-earth. He gives the Red Book of Westmarch (consisting of Bilbo's memoirs with some spare pages) to Sam, assuring him that a good life is still in store for him. Gandalf assures them that Hobbits will someday have descendants among humans, to preserve their own existence; and the film ends with Frodo's departure from the Grey Havens.

Voices

The voice cast is as follows:

 Aragorn – Theodore Bikel 
 Bilbo – Orson Bean
 Denethor – William Conrad 
 Elrond – Paul Frees
 Éowyn – Nellie Bellflower
 Frodo – Orson Bean
 Gandalf – John Huston 
 Gollum – Brother Theodore (credited under Theodore)
 Merry – Casey Kasem
 Pippin – Sonny Melendrez
 The Mouth of Sauron – Don Messick 
 Sam – Roddy McDowall 
 Théoden – Don Messick 
 Easterling – Don Messick 
 Orc – Paul Frees 
 Uruk-hai – Paul Frees
 Lord of the Nazgul – John Stephenson 
 Gondorian Guard – John Stephenson 
 The Minstrel – Glenn Yarbrough

Production

After the 1977 broadcast of The Hobbit on NBC, development and production began on The Return of the King at Rankin/Bass Productions in New York City under supervision of Arthur Rankin Jr. and Jules Bass. The film's original working title was Frodo, The Hobbit II. It was written by Romeo Muller with Rankin doing the script, designs for the characters and storyboards. The original cast from the previous film returned to reprise the voices of the characters with new actors joining them.

Orson Bean returned as the voice of the older Bilbo Baggins, as well as that of the story's hero, Frodo Baggins. John Huston came back as well, as the wizard Gandalf, and co-starring with them were: William Conrad as Denethor, Roddy McDowall as Samwise Gamgee, Theodore Bikel as Aragorn, and reprising his role of Gollum, Brother Theodore. Rankin/Bass stalwart Paul Frees replaced the late Cyril Ritchard as the voice of Elrond; Casey Kasem was Merry, with Sonny Melendrez as Pippin; Nellie Bellflower as Éowyn; and Glenn Yarbrough returned as principal vocalist, billed here as simply "the Minstrel of Gondor". Thurl Ravenscroft served in the chorus. Once the character voices were recorded, along with background music by Maury Laws, with Jules Bass writing songs and lyrics for the film, the animation production was done by Topcraft in Japan under supervision of Toru Hara, Tsuguyuki Kubo, Kazuyuki Kobayashi and others.

The release was threatened by a lawsuit filed by the Tolkien Estate and Fantasy Films on the basis that Rankin/Bass had not secured the U.S. and Canadian television rights to the book. The lawsuit was settled "amicably", allowing it to proceed with a May 1980 release.

The film is often mistaken for a sequel to Ralph Bakshi's 1978 animated film The Lord of the Rings. After Rankin/Bass became defunct in 1987, Warner Bros. acquired the rights to the special for home video distribution and chose to market the film, along with The Hobbit, as instalments of an animated Tolkien trilogy, with Bakshi's The Lord of the Rings (by then also owned by Warner Bros., from United Artists) acting as the middle chapter. This false promotion led to rumours that Rankin/Bass had originally decided to produce The Return of the King upon hearing that Bakshi's sequel to The Lord of the Rings had been cancelled. However, Rankin/Bass had always planned on making The Return of the King as a follow-up to their production of The Hobbit, even before the release of Bakshi's film. Nonetheless, the plot of the TV production begins roughly where the Bakshi film ends.

Reception

The film has garnered mixed reviews from modern sources. Charles Cassidy of Common Sense Media gave it a score of 3/5, and said, "Cartoon tale is darker, more complex than others in series". Steven D. Greydanus of Decent Films Guide gave it a C, and said, "Works even less well than The Hobbit, which really is a children's story… overbearing folk-ballad soundtrack doesn't even gesture lyrically to Tolkien's poetry". It currently holds a score of 67% on Rotten Tomatoes.

Director Arthur Rankin Jr. later stated, "We tried to do Return of the King... but it is an awful lot to put into it. I think [Peter] Jackson is having the same problem in his films. You can't deviate from these books, or somebody'll wait on the street for you! ...[In] The Return of the King, we had to summarize what had happened before, and then put it all together in 2 hours. It's not a very good film." Asked why he chose only to make The Return of the King, instead of making the entire Lord of the Rings trilogy, Rankin admitted, "I didn't know that the audience would sit still for it. I was wrong."

Home media
The Return of the King was first released on VHS by Warner Home Video in 1991, and for the second time as part of the "Warner Bros. Classic Tales" video collection in 1996. The film has been available on DVD since 2001, both individually and as a "boxed trilogy" with Rankin/Bass's The Hobbit and Bakshi's The Lord of the Rings.

References

External links

 
 
 Screen captures from the CED edition. Also features links to galleries of screen captures from other Tolkien animated films.

1980 films
1980 animated films
1980 television films
1980s American animated films
1980 fantasy films
1980 in American television
1980 television specials
American animated fantasy films
American Broadcasting Company television specials
American fantasy adventure films
1980s animated television specials
1980s children's fantasy films
Films scored by Maury Laws
Films based on British novels
Films based on fantasy novels
Films based on multiple works of a series
Television shows directed by Jules Bass
Films directed by Arthur Rankin Jr.
Musical television specials
Television shows based on British novels
Topcraft
Rankin/Bass Productions films
Television shows written by Romeo Muller
Films based on The Lord of the Rings
1980s British films